Jaya Prakash Reddy (8 May 1946 – 8 September 2020) was an Indian actor who predominantly appeared in Telugu films. Born in Sirvel of Andhra Pradesh, he came into the limelight with the film Samarasimha Reddy (1999) where he played the role of Veera Raghava Reddy. He acted as an antagonist in several films such as Jayam Manade Raa (2000) and Chennakesava Reddy (2002). Later in his career, he was also featured in many comic roles. He died at his home in Guntur on 8 September 2020, at an age of 74, from massive cardiac arrest. He was honoured with Special Jury Award (Alexander) for his contribution to Tollywood at the 16th Santosham Film Awards.

Selected filmography

Telugu films

Tamil films

Kannada films

Awards
Nandi Award for Best Villain - Jayam Manadera (2000)

References

External links
 

20th-century Indian male actors
2020 deaths
Telugu comedians
Place of birth missing
Nandi Award winners
Male actors in Telugu cinema
Indian male film actors
People from Kurnool district
Male actors from Andhra Pradesh
Male actors in Tamil cinema
21st-century Indian male actors
1946 births